"Hold On" is a song by Canadian crooner Michael Bublé, released as the second single from his fourth studio album, Crazy Love. The single was released on December 11, 2009, although it was serviced to radio again on February 14, 2011, after its appearance in an episode of the talent series Dancing on Ice.

Background
The single was released on December 11, 2009, in the United Kingdom, before a release in the United States followed on January 24, 2010. Prior to the release of the music video, a lyric video was made available via Bublé's official YouTube account. The song debuted on radio on Magic 105.4 FM in November 2009, three weeks before the music video, again directed by Rich Lee, premiered. Two main remixes of the song were issued alongside its release, including versions by J.R. Rotem and Chris Lord-Alge. The single was once again serviced to radio on February 14, 2011, after its appearance in an episode of the talent series Dancing on Ice.

Track listing
 Digital download
 "Hold On" (UK Radio Mix) - 4:07
 "Let It Snow, Let It Snow, Let It Snow" (Live) - 2:24

 Promotional CD single
 "Hold On" (JR Rotem Mix) - 3:51
 "Hold On" (Chris Lord Alge Radio Mix) - 4:07
 "Hold On" (UK Radio Mix) - 4:07
 "Hold On" (Album Version) - 4:05

Charts

Weekly charts

Year-end charts

References

2009 singles
Michael Bublé songs
Songs written by Michael Bublé
Songs written by Alan Chang
2000s ballads
Pop ballads
143 Records singles
Reprise Records singles
2009 songs
Songs written by Amy S. Foster